Sten Allan Olsson (28 October 1916 – 12 July 2013) was a Swedish billionaire businessman, the founder, CEO and owner of Stena Sphere.

Sten Allan Olsson was born on 28 October 1916, on Donsö, in the Gothenburg archipelago, the son of a schooner owner and captain. He was educated at Ljungskile Folk High School, followed by a commercial college in Gothenburg.

Olsson started a Gothenburg metals and rubber trading company in 1939, at the start of the Second World War, and moved into freight shipping. He founded the ferry company Stena Line in 1962, initially on the Gothenburg-Skagen route.

He died on 12 July 2013.

He married Birgit Andersson in 1944, and they had three children.

References

External links

1916 births
2013 deaths
People from Gothenburg
Swedish businesspeople
Swedish billionaires